BWU may mean:
 BWU, a song by Tegan and Sara
 Baldwin Wallace University, in Berea, Ohio
 Barbados Workers' Union
 Blind Workers' Union of Victoria, a trade union in Australia
 Big Willy Unleashed, a side game in the Destroy All Humans franchise
 Bankstown Airport, IATA airport code "BWU"